Old Time Pottery is a discount home décor retailer based in Murfreesboro, Tennessee.  As of February 2018, it had 43 stores, including 13 in Florida, 4 in Tennessee, Ohio and Alabama, 3 in Indiana and Illinois, two in North Carolina, South Carolina and Missouri, and one in Oklahoma and Georgia.

References

External links
 Old Time Pottery website

American companies established in 1986
Retail companies established in 1986
Companies based in Nashville, Tennessee
Murfreesboro, Tennessee
Privately held companies based in Tennessee
1986 establishments in Tennessee
Companies that filed for Chapter 11 bankruptcy in 2020